Full Negative (or) Breaks is the fourth studio album by Bright, released in 2000.

Following its release, the band went on hiatus until 2005's Bells Break Their Towers. In the interim, the outfit relocated from Boston, Massachusetts to Brooklyn, New York. A stop-gap EP entitled The Miller Fantasies saw re-release as a stand-alone album in 2002, as the EP was initially bundled with the vinyl record version of this album on Compact Disc media.

Critical reception
AllMusic wrote: "Liberal with reverb and intricate texture, they embrace prog rock sensibilities throughout the disc, riding waves of melodic drum and guitar, creating a sound bigger than the sum of its parts."

Track listing
"Heart of the Park" – 8:02
"Yeah! Holy Stones" – 4:26
"Full Negative" – 6:11
"The Fall" – 6:00
"Parable of the Bicycle" – 5:56
"I'm Colliding" – 4:59
"Blue Lines" – 5:23
"The Spire Will Be Your Landmark" – 9:35
"Must I Be Furious?" – 3:58

References

2000 albums
Bright (American band) albums
Darla Records albums